The Sharks of Gibraltar (French: Les requins de Gibraltar) is a 1947 French spy thriller film directed by Emil E. Reinert and starring Annie Ducaux, Louis Salou and Yves Vincent.

Cast

See also
Gibraltar (1938)
Gibraltar (1964)

References

Bibliography 
 Alberca, Julio Ponce. Gibraltar and the Spanish Civil. Bloomsbury Publishing, 2015.
 Rège, Philippe. Encyclopedia of French Film Directors, Volume 1. Scarecrow Press, 2009.

External links 
 

1947 films
1940s thriller films
French thriller films
1940s French-language films
Films directed by Emil-Edwin Reinert
Films scored by Alain Romans
Seafaring films
French black-and-white films
1940s French films

fr:Les Requins de Gibraltar